William Carter is an American former Negro league third baseman who played in the 1940s.

Carter played for the Harrisburg Stars in 1943. In eight recorded games, he posted 12 hits in 35 plate appearances.

References

External links
 and Seamheads

Year of birth missing
Place of birth missing
Harrisburg Stars players
Baseball third basemen